Lynda Ruth Whiteley (married name Wright) (born 1963), is a female former athlete who competed for England.

Athletics career
Whiteley was a two times National champion after winning the 1983 and 1984 AAA National Championships in the discus.

She represented England and won a bronze medal in the discus, at the 1982 Commonwealth Games in Brisbane, Queensland, Australia.

References

1963 births
English female discus throwers
Athletes (track and field) at the 1982 Commonwealth Games
Commonwealth Games medallists in athletics
Commonwealth Games bronze medallists for England
Living people
Medallists at the 1982 Commonwealth Games